"Mama's Pearl" was a hit recording for The Jackson 5 in 1971 and was written by The Corporation, a songwriting team that had helped the group score four consecutive #1 singles.

Chart performance
"Mama's Pearl" was one of six consecutive top 5 singles for the group. "Mama's Pearl" went to number two for two weeks on the Billboard Hot 100 behind, "One Bad Apple" by The Osmonds.  On the soul singles it likewise peaked at number two. Overseas, "Mama's Pearl" peaked at #25 in the UK.

Song background
The song, while sung mostly by Michael featured cameo spots from brothers Jermaine and Jackie.  According to a Jackson biographer, "Mama's Pearl" was originally called "Guess Who's Making Whoopie (With Your Girlfriend)". Producer Deke Richards reportedly had the lyrics and title changed to preserve Michael Jackson's youthful, innocent image.
The demo version has since been released on the 2012 compilation "Come and Get It: The Rare Pearls".

Personnel
Lead and background vocals: Michael Jackson, Jermaine Jackson, Jackie Jackson, Tito Jackson and Marlon Jackson
Written, produced, and arranged by The Corporation: Berry Gordy, Alphonzo Mizell, Freddie Perren and Deke Richards
Instrumentation by various Los Angeles studio musicians

Charts

References

1971 singles
The Jackson 5 songs
Songs written by Berry Gordy
Songs written by Freddie Perren
Songs written by Deke Richards
Motown singles
Songs written by Alphonzo Mizell
1971 songs
Cashbox number-one singles
bubblegum pop songs